Martin Klus (born 8 June 1980) is a Slovak academic, commentator, politician and political theorist. He has a postgraduate diploma in Theory of Politics.

Prior to entering Slovak politics, Klus worked as a university lecturer and political analyst, providing political analyses to domestic media (radio and television of Slovakia, TA3, TV JOJ, Markíza, Radio Lumen, Hospodárske noviny, Pravda, Nový čas, aktualne.sk, actuality.sk, etc.) and foreign media (Česká televize, Lidové noviny, Magyar Rádió, Wiener Zeitung, TRT, BBC, etc.).

In  2013 and 2014, Klus was ranked among the most cited Slovak political scientists and sociologists.

Since 1999, Klus has been engaged in the non-profit sector with the aim to empower civic and student participation in public affairs, but also in educational and urban environment improving activities. He often takes part in political, professional and civic initiatives on the topic of electoral and referendum legislation.

Education 
After Klus finished his secondary school studies in 1998, he started his master's degree at the Faculty of Humanistics, University of Trnava. He finished in 2003 at the Faculty of Political Sciences and International Relations of Matej Bel University in Banská Bystrica.

In 2004 Klus attained  a PhD in Theory of Politics at Matej Bel.

Academic career 
In 2003, Klus became a fellow and lecturer at the Department of Public Policy and Public Administration and the Department of Economy at the Faculty of Political Sciences and International Relations of Matej Bel University. After habilitation in 2008, he became an assistant professor.

In 2012 Klus obtained an MBA at the Sales Manager Academy in Vienna. He was lecturing, as a hosting assistant professor, in Sládkovičovo, Kolín and Brno in the Czech Republic and at the Nicolaus Copernicus University in Toruń. In 2010, Klus became vice-rector for international and public relations and publications, and lecturer at the Department of Social Sciences at the University of St. Cyril and Methodius in Trnava. He held the same position in November and December 2014 at Matej Bel University.

Since 2015, Klus has been assistant professor at the Faculty of Philosophy, University of Trnava.

Political career 
In the 2010 municipal elections, Klus achieved 1056 votes in Banská Bystrica's 7th precinct and became the first substitute representative, one place ahead of Marian Kotleba. On 15 November 2014, he achieved the highest vote in Rudlová-Sásova precinct, gaining 1734 votes

In December 2014, announced his affiliation with the Freedom and Solidarity political party, advising on foreign policy and political systems. That same month,  he resigned the vice-rector seat of Matej Bel University.

In 2016, Klus ran for parliamentary election on the Freedom and Solidarity candidate list. The party gained 315,558 votes (12.1%) with 21,513 votes of preference for Martin Klus, which ensured him the seat of Member of the National Council of the Slovak Republic. In the 2016-2020 parliamentary term, he served as the Vice Chairman of the National Council European Affairs Committee and Member of the National Council Foreign Affairs Committee.

On 31 March 2017 Klus announced his campaign for the Governor of Banská Bystrica Region election taking place in November 2017. In June 2017, he gained broad support of the opposition parties including Freedom and Solidarity, Ordinary People, New Majority, Christian Democratic Movement and Civic Conservative Party. On 3 October 2017, based on pre-election polls, he dropped out of the race in favor of Ján Lunter, who defeated Marian Kotleba.

On 10 October 2019, Klus was elected as Chairman of the SaS caucus after the exodus of few members. On October 16, 2019 he was elected as the Deputy Speaker of the National Council  to fill the post vacated by Lucia Ďuriš Nicholsonová,. Since 13 October 2019, Klus has  held the position of Vice Chairman of the NATO PA Subcommittee on NATO Partnership, as the first Slovak appointee in such a position.

From the parliamentary elections in 2020 until the ministerial resignations of SaS in Heger's Cabinet, Klus was the State Secretary of the Ministry of Foreign and European Affairs. Afterwards he returned to the National Council in September 2022. However, in October, 2022, Klus quit the party's parliamentary group and resigned from his positions in the party as a Vice-Chairman and Team Leader, citing that he could no longer align himself with what the party stands for, namely he differently assesses the recent political situation in Slovakia particularly about a possible snap election than SaS does. He added that a snap election would be of great assistance to Robert Fico in returning to political power that he wants to avoid all the way. Therefore he could not any more vote in unity with the party's parliamentary group in each and every case. Nevertheless, he was still willing to coordinate with the party on a case by case basis. On 1 December, SaS members of parliament put forth a motion of no confidence. In response, Klus announced his departure from SaS entirely. Days after the announcement, Klus's former colleague in SaS, Marián Viskupič revealed that his split from the party had solved in an amicable way and Klus was about to opt out of the nationwide politics.

References 

Slovak political scientists
1980 births
Living people
Members of the National Council (Slovakia) 2016-2020
Matej Bel University alumni
Members of the National Council (Slovakia) 2020-present